National Ensemble of Folk Dances and Songs of Serbia "Kolo", known simply as Ensemble "Kolo", was established on 5 May 1948 by the decision of People's Republic of Serbia which at that time was one of the six constitutional republics of the Federal People's Republic of Yugoslavia. It was established as a professional national ensemble with the aim of collecting, arranging and preserving the general national dance, song and musical treasures. Its first performance was organized 10 days after the establishment in Stanković Musical School in Belgrade. Since its establishment in 1948 until 2012 it had more than 6,000 concerts in front of more than 12 million people.

Gallery

See also
Kolo (dance)
Serbian dances
Music of Serbia
List of Serbian folk songs

References

External links
Official page

Serbian music history
Serbian folk music
Dance in Serbia
Serbian folklore
Serbian cultural organizations